The Prameya (ପ୍ରମେୟ), a newspaper published in the Odia language, is the third-most read newspaper in Oriya (after Sambad and Samaja). In 2015 it launched its own TV channel, Prameya News7, available through satellite television.

References

Odia-language newspapers
Newspapers published in Odisha
Publications with year of establishment missing